James Hillyer (March 23, 1928 – February 19, 1991) was an American football coach.  He was the 11th head football coach at Prairie View A&M University in Prairie View, Texas and he held that position for the 1971 season.  His record at Prairie View was 3–7.

Hillyer attended Solomon Coles High School in Corpus Christi, Texas, where he starred in football and basketball.  He played college football as a fullback at Samuel Huston College—now known as Huston–Tillotson University.  Hillyer  was the head football coach at Dunbar High School in Lubbock, Texas for seven seasons, compiling a record of 51–6–5.  He was hired in 1970 as an assistant coach as Prairie View A&M.

Head coaching record

College

References

External links
 

1928 births
1991 deaths
American football fullbacks
Colorado State Rams football coaches
Prairie View A&M Panthers football coaches
Samuel Huston Dragons football players
High school football coaches in Texas
Sportspeople from Corpus Christi, Texas
Coaches of American football from Texas
Players of American football from Texas
African-American coaches of American football
African-American players of American football
20th-century African-American sportspeople